The  were a class of eight kaibōkan escort vessels built for the Imperial Japanese Navy during World War II. Five of the eight ships were sunk during the war.

Background
The Mikura-class kaibōkan, as with the  torpedo boat, was a consequence of  the 1930 London Naval Treaty, which placed limitations on the total destroyer tonnage the Imperial Japanese Navy was permitted. One way in which the treaty could be circumvented was to use a loophole in the treaty which permitted ships of between 600 and 2,000 tons, with no more than four guns over 76mm, no torpedoes, and with a maximum speed of no more than 20 knots. A new class of vessel was designed to use this loophole, and was given the obsolete designation of kaibōkan (Kai = sea, ocean, Bo = defence, Kan = ship), which had previously been used to designate obsolete battleships which had been reassigned to coastal defense duties. The 1941 Rapid Naval Armaments Supplement Programme authorized eight of these new vessels, which were designated the Mikura-class. 

Production began in late 1942 concurrently with later Etorofu-class vessels.

Description
Although the Mikura-class was based on the two previous classes of escort vessels and used a simplified version of the Etorofu-class hull, it presented a much different appearance, with a stepped bridge, smaller  single smokestack located further aft, shape of the aft deckhouse, and the type of main gun.

The main battery of the Mikura-class consisted of three Type 10 120 mm AA guns one forward, and a twin unshielded mount aft. These were dual-purpose guns capable of attacking both surface and aircraft targets. Anti-aircraft protection was by four Type 96  anti-aircraft guns in two twin-gun mounts abreast the bridge. The Mikura class was initially armed with 120 Type 95  depth charges with two Type 94 depth charge launchers and had a Model 93 sonar and a Type 93 hydrophone. 

Later in the war, a third Type 94 depth charge launcher was added on the stern and the  paravanes were removed. During the Pacific War, the number of Type 96 anti-aircraft guns was increased with the addition of a triple-mount in front of the bridge and an additional four single-mounts. A Type 22 and a Type 13 radar were also added. A Type 97  trench mortar was also installed front of the bridge

Operational service
All eight vessels in the class saw extensive combat service in the South China Sea and the East China Sea, where they were used for convoy escort. Of the eight vessels in the class, five were lost in combat (four to USN submarines). One ship survived the war to be used for repatriation duties and one was given as a reparations to the Republic of China Navy, under whose flag it continued to serve until scrapped in 1963.

Ships in class

See also
Etorofu-class escort ship
Hiburi-class escort ship
Ukuru-class escort ship
Type C escort ship
Type D escort ship
Destroyer escort
Tacoma-class frigate
Flower-class corvette

Notes

References 

 Mikura class at Combined Fleet (Retrieved November 25, 2007)
 Nishida (Retrieved April 7, 2020)
 Worth, Richard, Fleets of World War II, Da Capo Press (2001), 

Mikura
Escort ships of the Imperial Japanese Navy